The black-throated parrotbill (Suthora nipalensis) is a parrotbill species often placed with the Old World babblers (family Timaliidae) or in a distinct family Sylviidae, but it actually seems to belong to the distinct family Paradoxornithidae.

It is found in the northern regions of the Indian subcontinent, primarily in the central and eastern Himalayas, and in adjoining parts of Southeast Asia.  The species ranges across Bhutan, India, Laos, Myanmar, Nepal, Thailand, Tibet and Vietnam. Its natural habitat is subtropical or tropical moist montane forests.

Gallery

References

Robson, C. (2007). Family Paradoxornithidae (Parrotbills) pp. 292 – 321   in; del Hoyo, J., Elliott, A. & Christie, D.A. eds. Handbook of the Birds of the World, Vol. 12. Picathartes to Tits and Chickadees. Lynx Edicions, Barcelona.

black-throated parrotbill
black-throated parrotbill
Birds of Eastern Himalaya
Birds of Laos
Birds of Myanmar
Birds of Nepal
Birds of Thailand
Birds of Vietnam
Birds of North India
black-throated parrotbill
Taxonomy articles created by Polbot